Vatan may refer to:

Places
Canton of Vatan, a former canton in the Indre department in France
Vatan, Indre, a commune in the Indre department in France
Vatan, Iran, a village in Golestan Province, Iran
Vatan, Farkhor District, a town and jamoat in Tajikistan

People
Vatan Huseynli, Azerbaijani boxer
Bijan Nobaveh-Vatan, Iranian anchorman and conservative politician

Politics
Patriotic Party (Turkey), political party in Turkey known in Turkish as Vatan Partisi
Vatan ve Hürriyet ("Motherland and Liberty" in Turkish), a small, secret revolutionary society of reformist officers opposed to the autocratic regime of Ottoman sultan Abdul Hamid II in the early 20th century

Media
Vatan, a Turkish daily newspaper founded in 2002
Vatan (former newspaper), now defunct Turlish newspaper (1923-1925, 1940-1978)
Vatan (newspaper), a Dagestan, Russia socio-political newspaper in the Judeo-Tat and Russian languages, founded in 1928

Others
Vatan, an opera by Gara Garayev
Vatan Aur Desh, the first of the two volumes of the novel Jhutha Sach by the author Yashpal

See also
Watan (disambiguation)